Zhdanovsky Island is a peninsula on Karelian Isthmus, along the southern shore of Vuoksi River.

Karelian Isthmus